Struthiopteris fallax is a small species of fern in the family Blechnaceae. It is endemic to Iceland where it lives in close proximity to hot springs.

In Iceland it is locally red listed as an endangered species (EN) but as of April 2021 it has not been assessed by the IUCN.

References

Blechnaceae
Flora of Iceland